Coonce is a surname. Notable people with the surname include:

Harry Coonce (born 1939), American mathematician
Rick Coonce (1946–2011), American drummer
Garth Coonce, American televangelist

References